The Crystal Beach Cyclone was one of a 'Terrifying Triplet' of highly extreme and intense roller coasters designed and built by Harry G. Traver in the late 1920s. The Cyclone was located at the Crystal Beach Park in Ontario, Canada.

History
Three of these coasters (known as the 'Terrifying Triplets' of the Giant Cyclone Safety Coasters) were designed and built.  The Crystal Beach 'Cyclone' and the Revere Beach 'Lightning' were both opened in 1927.  The following year, the Schneck brothers, owners of Palisades Park in Fort Lee, NJ, contracted Traver to build a 'Cyclone' for the 1928 season.  Of the three, the Crystal Beach version was the most famous and longest lasting, eventually being dismantled in September 1946 due to the high maintenance costs and falling revenues. Some of the wood and steel from the Cyclone was used by John Allen and Herbert Schmeck (both designers for the Philadelphia Toboggan Company) in the construction of the Crystal Beach Comet coaster in 1948.

Construction
Over 225 tonnes of metal were used in building the ride, which used a steel support structure instead of the more traditional wood.  Having said this, it is still considered a "woodie", due to the construction of the track (300 X 25 millimetre wood laminants topped by a flat steel rail). Total length of wood used was about 6,100 metres - all British Columbia fir. At night, 1,000 small incandescent lamps lit the ride.

Ride layout
The layout consisted of a twisted arrangement of track with many curved, and steeply angled drops, banking at up to 80 degrees, the trains traversed multiple banked spirals and figure-8 sections. Other than one trim brake, there were no brake runs outside of the station as there were no level portions of track where brakes could be located (The trim brake was between the spiral's exit and the figure 8 element).

Ride features
 curve out of the station onto the lift
 the chain lift
 a spiraling first drop about 90 feet tall
 a second hill which ended about 82 feet above the ground
 an abrupt left turn down the second drop at 52 degrees
 a spiral drop
 the emergency brakes
 a steep drop into the high speed figure eight
 another drop and "hops" under the lift hill
 a 210 degree high speed turn under the coaster's superstructure
 a "zigzag" or "jazz twister" track (now called trick track)
 a series of track which rose and fell like small, one foot bunny hops, leading back to the station

Differences between designs
All three were very similar in their design, following the same basic layout. The main difference in the design was that the spiral on the Cyclone at Palisades was even tighter than the two preceding coasters because of the extremely limited space in the park.

Operation
The ride ran one or two trains consisting of three or five four-passenger cars depending on crowds. Later, the trains would be permanently reduced to three cars to keep forces on the structure lower.

Ride time was around 40 seconds, discounting station to top of the lift, which extended the time to a total of about 70 seconds. This would have been slightly faster than before opening day because almost half a metre had been removed from the height of the second hill due to roll-back problems.

Reports say the ride at Crystal Beach drew 75,000 on opening day and crowds were so heavy that a railing was broken by those pushing to get close to the new ride. One patron rode 67 times that day and on its second day of operation, two boys rode 52 times.

Accidents and incidents
Over 5 million rides were given in the Cyclone's 20-year history with only one fatality. This occurred on opening day May 30, 1938, when 22-year-old Amos Wiedrich allegedly stood up to take his suitcoat off. He was thrown from the train after the first drop and fell to his death, being hit seconds later by the train he had been riding in. At the inquest however, a failed lap bar was deemed to be the cause and the rider's estate was awarded $3000 by the court.

Yvonne Salais died on the second day of sister coaster Lightning's operation, in 1927, after having jumped out.

The Crystal Beach ride also kept a nurse in the station who was there to assist anyone who fainted, although she was originally hired to help lower insurance costs. Later, it is rumored that she was kept on the payroll to help keep the Cyclone known as one of the fiercest coasters around. Popular coaster lore says that she kept smelling salts on her and that a hot dog stand adjacent to the coaster sold splints.

Maintenance issues
These coasters, unfortunately, turned out to be a maintenance headache due to the high forces generated on the structure. Some reduction was gained through the use of three-car trains, but still the track suffered. According to Robert Cartmell's book "The Incredible Scream Machine: A History of the Roller Coaster", a man who worked at Palisades while the Traver-designed Cyclone operated said that he could not remember one week where it operated every day. Structural and mechanical failures prevented it from being able to be open on anything resembling a regular schedule, and the sheer viciousness of the ride did not help to endear the coaster to the park's visitors.

In 1938, the entire ride at Crystal Beach was overhauled (supposedly by Herbert Schmeck) with many extra stress ties added.

Ride Experience

Speed & G-Forces
The "Cyclone" was said to place over 4 Gs of force on passengers, and had a top speed approaching . Although the G-force statistic is likely true (and in fact may be low), the top speed advertised might be an exaggeration. The maximum velocity attainable from lift height to ground level, which the first drop did, would be  with a zero initial velocity.  If the cyclone imparted an initial velocity to the cars at the top of the hill (say from a lift chain) the car may have reached such advertised speeds.

Riders Quotes
Ed Cowley, who had ridden The "Cyclone" many times in his life, said:

Erma Andrews, who piloted biplanes from the age of sixteen and became a registered nurse, rode the Crystal Beach "Cyclone" many times and recalled the following story:

{{cquote|I rode the Cyclone a lot. I was quite used to thrilling rides--you know, 'ho-hum,' ''passé!--but it was a real pisser! At one point, it looked like you were going to go right into the drink, because the ride was built on stilts, you see, and it jutted out over the lake, and you'd turn and swoop down right there. They had a nurse stationed at the end of it, because people would come off sick or injured. One time, they put me in the seat with this boy who was riding alone, and by the time the ride was over, I was in that boy's lap, holding on to him for dear life with my face in his neck.  I don't know how I could have ended up there; they snugged that bar right down tight on your laps because they didn't want anyone to fall out, but the ride was so violent, that I guess we just got mixed in with each other.  I was embarrassed and started to leave, but I guess the boy didn't mind any.  He was laughing and grinning, and by the time I'd extricated myself from his lap, he'd already given them another ticket, and off we went again!}}

In September 2000 'coasterglobe.com interviewed Ed Mills, who described his experience of riding the Cyclone in 1945:

 References 

External links
 Closed Canadian Parks, Ontario, Crystal Beach (1888-1989)
 Ultimate rollercoaster.com Ride Designers - Harry G. TraverVideo'''
 YouTube - Crystal Beach Cyclone 1927-1946 Original Footage

Roller coasters in Ontario
Roller coasters introduced in 1927